Rondell Jerome Sheridan (born August 15, 1958) is an American actor, comedian, and television director, best known for his four-year portrayal of Victor Baxter, the goofy-yet-lovable father of a psychic teenager, in the Disney Channel sitcom That's So Raven, as well as its later spin-offs Cory in the House and Raven's Home. Sheridan is an alumnus of Marquette University. Sheridan also starred as Dr. Ron Aimes on the short-lived NBC/UPN sitcom Minor Adjustments during the 1995-1996 television season.

Filmography

Films

Television

Music video
 1985 "Part-Time Lover" - Stevie Wonder
Was in the  music video for the Sesame Street song Danger Danger

References

External links
 Official website
 
 
 Audio Interview at Tommy2.Net

1958 births
Living people
Male actors from Chicago
African-American male comedians
American male comedians
African-American male actors
African-American television directors
American male television actors
American television talk show hosts
American television directors
Circle in the Square Theatre School alumni
Marquette University alumni
Comedians from Illinois
21st-century African-American people
20th-century African-American people